Ross Hepburn (born 1972 in Edinburgh, Scotland) is a Scottish male curler.

Teams

References

External links
 
 

Living people
1972 births
Curlers from Edinburgh
Scottish male curlers
Scottish curling champions